FC Dinamo Samarqand is an Uzbek professional football club, based in city of Samarkand, Uzbekistan. Currently it plays in Uzbekistan Pro League.

History
FC Dinamo Samarqand is one of the oldest clubs in Uzbekistan. The club was founded in 1960. Club started to play in one of regional zones of Soviet Second League. In 1992 club played in Uzbek League under name Maroqand Samarqand. Between 1994 and 1998 seasons club competed in First League. In the 2000 season FK Dinamo was runners-up of Uzbek Cup, losing in final against Dustlik and finished league as 4th, which is their highest ranking.

Club names

 1960–1963: Dinamo Samarqand
 1963–1967: Spartak Samarqand
 1967–1968: Sogdiana Samarqand
 1968–1970: FK Samarqand
 1970–1976: Stroitel Samarqand
 1976–1991: Dinamo Samarqand
 1991–1993: Maroqand Samarqand
 1993–1997: Dinamo Samarqand
 1997–1998: Afrosiyob Samarqand
 1998–2000: FK Samarqand
 2000–2008: FK Samarqand-Dinamo
 2008–present: FK Dinamo Samarqand

Domestic history

Stadium
Dinamo Samarqand plays its home matches at Dinamo Stadium. The stadium was built in 1963 and originally holds 13,800 spectators. In 2011 stadium has undergone renovation works.

Players

Current squad

Management

Board of directors

Former coaches

 Berador Abduraimov (1980–1981)
 Nikolay Kiselyov (1985–1986)
 Aleksandr Ivankov (1987–1988)
 Vladimir Fedin (1989)
 Shavkat Akhmerov (July 1990)
 Yuriy Mamedov (July 1990–1991)
 Rustam Istamov (1991)
 Nikolai Solovyov (1992)
 Rustam Istamov (1993)
 Khakim Fuzailov (2000–2002)
 Berador Abduraimov (June 2002–September 2003)
 Tachmurad Agamuradov (2007–2008)
 Azamat Abduraimov (2008–2010)
 Viktor Djalilov (2010–2011)
 Akhmad Ubaydullaev (2011–2012)
 Kamo Gazarov (2013)
 Ravshan Khaydarov (2013–2014)
 Tachmurad Agamuradov (2014–2015)
 Bakhrom Khakimov (July 7, 2015–March 2016)
 Ilkhom Sharipov (March 2016–February 2017)
 Oleg Tyulkin (2017–2020)
 Sergey Lushan (2020–2021)

Honours
 Uzbekistan Pro League:
 Champions (1): 2016

References

External links
 FC Dinamo Samarqand Official website 
 Dinamo Samarqand Fan Website 
 FK Dinamo Samarqand – Weltfussballarchiv 
 FK Dinamo Samarqand – soccerway

Association football clubs established in 1960
Dinamo
Sport in Samarkand
1960 establishments in Uzbekistan